Stephen Kramer Glickman (born March 17, 1979) is a Canadian-American comedian, actor, musician and podcast host based in Los Angeles, California. He is best known as for his role as Gustavo Rocque on the Nickelodeon sitcom Big Time Rush (2009–2013), and for co-hosting the podcast The Night Time Show.

Early life
Stephen Kramer Glickman was born to a Jewish family of Russian extraction in London, Ontario, Canada, but was raised in Carlsbad, California where he grew up performing in live theatre and collecting Star Wars toys. He attended the American Academy of Dramatic Arts, and graduated from the American Musical and Dramatic Academy.

Career
Kramer Glickman starred as record producer Gustavo Rocque on the Nickelodeon television series, Big Time Rush. In 2007, he was cast as Shrek in Shrek the Musical, and played the part in the original Broadway workshops and readings, before Brian d'Arcy James was cast in 2008.

He has also voiced Billy Bob in an animated web series named Trailer Trash produced by Stupid Factory Studios and Titmouse and distributed by Mondo Media and Lionsgate.

Filmography

Film

Television

Web

References

External links

1979 births
21st-century Canadian male actors
21st-century American male actors
Canadian emigrants to the United States
Canadian male film actors
Canadian stand-up comedians
Canadian male television actors
Canadian male voice actors
Comedians from Ontario
Jewish Canadian comedians
Jewish Canadian male actors
American male film actors
American stand-up comedians
American male television actors
American male voice actors
Jewish American male comedians
Jewish American male actors
Living people
Male actors from London, Ontario
21st-century American Jews
American people of Canadian descent
Canadian people of Russian descent
American people of Russian descent